Hervé Bazin (17 April 191117 February 1996) was a French writer, whose best-known novels covered semi-autobiographical topics of teenage rebellion and dysfunctional families.

Biography 
Bazin, born Jean-Pierre Hervé-Bazin in Angers, Maine-et-Loire, France came from a high-bourgeois Catholic family. He was the great-nephew of the writer René Bazin. His father was a magistrate who with his wife had been sent to China to take up a diplomatic post. Hervé and his brother were brought up in the ancestral home, the chateau of Le Patys, by their grandmother. When she died, his mother returned from Hanoi with reluctance. She sent Bazin to a variety of clerical establishments and then to the military academy, the Prytanée de la Fleche, from which he was expelled as incompetent.  He opposed his authoritarian mother, ran away several times during his teens, and refused Catholic teachings.  At the age of 20 he broke up with his family.

Leaving his home for Paris, he took a degree in literature at the Sorbonne. During fifteen years of writing poetry with little success, Bazin worked in many small jobs. Notable work of this period included founding a poetic review, la Coquille (The Shell, only eight volumes), named after the medieval poet-beggars, the coquillards of Villon's days, and "À la poursuite d'Iris" in 1948. He won the 1947 Prix Apollinaire for Jour, his first book of poetry.

Following the advice of Paul Valéry, he left poetry to focus on prose.

Childhood conflicts with his mother inspired the novel Viper in the Fist in 1948. The novel portrays the hatred between a mother nicknamed Folcoche (from the French "folle" (crazy) and "cochonne" (pig) and her children, including the narrator Jean Rezeau, called "Brasse-bouillon". Maurice Nadeau described the novel as "Atrides in duffle-coat" . The book was immensely successful in postwar France, and was followed by La Mort du Petit Cheval and Le Cri de la Chouette to create a trilogy. In other works, Bazin returned to the theme of the family. In addition to novels, he also wrote short stories and essays.

Bazin became a member of the Académie Goncourt in 1958, replacing Francis Carco. He became its president in 1973, and was replaced, after his death, by Jorge Semprún, while the presidency was given to François Nourissier.

Politically, Bazin belonged to the Mouvement de la Paix, in relation with the communist party of which he was a sympathizer. He obtained the Lenin Peace Prize in 1979. This made Roger Peyrefitte say jokingly: "Hervé Bazin had two prizes which fitted each other: the Lenin Peace Prize and the black humour prize."

In 1995, he gave his manuscripts and letters to the record office of the town of Nancy, which already owned the archives of the Goncourt brothers, who originated from the town. Bazin died in Angers.

Due to a juridical imbroglio, the six children of his first marriages obtained, against the will of his last spouse and last son, the auction of the archive at the Hôtel Drouot on 29 October 2004. With help from the district's authorities, the university library of Angers managed to preempt almost the whole of the estate, meaning 22 manuscripts and about 9000 letters which were made available to the research community, as the author wished.

Orthography and punctuation
In his 1966 essay Plumons l’Oiseau (“Let's pluck the bird”): Bazin proposed a nearly phonemic orthography for the French language called “l’ortografiǝ lojikǝ”(logical orthography).

{| class="wikitable"
!Letter
!Name
!Name (IPA)
! Note
|-
| a || a (wvèr) ||  ||
|-
| (á) || a fèrmé ||  || optional
|-
| e || e ||  ||
|-
| é || é ||  ||
|-
| è || è ||  ||
|-
| œ || œ (wvèr) ||  ||
|-
| (œ́) || œ fèrmé ||   || optional
|-
| o || ɔ (wvèr) ||  ||
|-
| ó || ó (fèrmé) ||  || required
|-
| i || i ||  ||
|-
| u || u ||  ||
|-
| w || w ||  || ou vowel
|-
| ã || ã ||  ||
|-
| ẽ || ẽ ||  ||
|-
| õ || õ ||  ||
|-
| œ̃ || œ̃ ||  ||
|-
| b || bé ||  ||
|-
| k || ké ||  ||
|-
| d || dé ||  ||
|-
| f || fé ||  ||
|-
| g || gé ||  || always hard
|-
| h || hé ||  || soft ch
|-
| j || jé ||  ||
|-
| l || lé ||  ||
|-
| m || mé ||  ||
|-
| n || né ||  ||
|-
| ñ || ñé || ,  ||
|-
| p || pé ||  ||
|-
| r || ré ||  ||
|-
| s || sé ||  || never voiced
|-
| t || té ||  ||
|-
| v || vé ||  ||
|-
| z || zé ||  ||
|-
| y || yé ||  ||
|-
| u͐ || u͐e ||  ||
|-
| w͐ || w͐e ||  ||
|-
| ɔ || le siñə dur ||  || /h/ where necessary
|-
| ə || le siñə mw ||  || sometimes-silent /e/
|-
| × || le siñə du pluryèl ɛ̃sonor ||  || sometimes-silent plural (e.g. femmes → fam×)
|-
| ◌̇ || le point de différenciation || || marker of homophones (e.g. ça → ṡa, whereas sa → sa)
|}

He also proposed six new “points d’intonation” (punctuation marks):

Example:

Published works

 Jour, poems, 1947
 A la poursuite d'Iris, poems, 1948
 Vipère au poing (Viper in the Fist), autobiographical novel, 1948
 La Tête contre les murs, novel, publié en 1949 
 La Mort du petit cheval, autobiographical novel, 1950 
 Le bureau des mariages, short stories, 1951
 Lève-toi et marche, novel, 1952
 Humeurs, poems, 1953
 Contre vents et marées, 1953 
 L'Huile sur le feu, novel, 1954
 Qui j'ose aimer, novel, 1956
 La fin des asiles, essay, 1959
 Au nom du fils, novel, 1960  
 Chapeau bas, short stories, 1963 : Chapeau bas, Bouc émissaire, La hotte, M. le conseiller du coeur, Souvenirs d'un amnésique, Mansarde à louer, La Clope
 Plumons l'oiseau, essay, 1966
 Le Matrimoine, novel, 1967
 Les bienheureux de La Désolation, account, 1970 
 Le Cri de la chouette, autobiographical novel, 1972
 Madame Ex, novel, 1975
 Traits, 1976
 Ce que je crois, 1977
 Un feu dévore un autre feu, 1978
 L'Église verte, novel, 1981
 Qui est le prince?, 1981
 Abécédaire, 1984
 Le Démon de minuit, 1988 
 L'École des pères, novel, 1991
 Le grand méchant doux, 1992
 Le Neuvième jour, 1994

Notes

References

Sources

 Jean-Louis de Rambures, "Comment travaillent les écrivains", Paris 1978 (interview with Hervé Bazin, in French)

External links
 
 Hervé Bazin at the library of the University of Angers

1911 births
1996 deaths
People from Angers
University of Paris alumni
20th-century French poets
20th-century French male writers
Lenin Peace Prize recipients
20th-century French novelists
French male essayists
French male poets
French male novelists
French male short story writers
French short story writers
Prix Guillaume Apollinaire winners
20th-century French essayists